The Porsche Sprint Challenge Middle East is the Middle East motor racing series based on the famous Porsche 911 GT3 Cup launched in 2009.

Due to summer temperatures in the Middle East, the races are held in the winter to have regular temperatures for cars, tires, teams and drivers.

Each season starts at the end of a year (in November) and finishes (in March) the next year.

Champions

External links
 Porsche Sprint Challenge Middle East official website
 Porsche GT3 Championship Middle East (champions and race winners)

Middle East